

Actors

Advertising
 Axelrod, Basset Hound, appeared in commercials and print ads for Flying "A" Service Station advertisements in the 1960s
 Banjo, portrayed Alex, an Irish Setter/Golden Retriever mix and star of Stroh's beer advertising in the 1980s. Also mentioned in the Tone Lōc song, "Funky Cold Medina".
 Cheeka, a Pug who appeared in the popular "You & I" advertising campaign of Hutch's cellular service in India, along with the child actor Jayaram
 Gidget, a female Chihuahua, was featured in a Taco Bell advertising campaign as the "Taco Bell Chihuahua". She also played the role of Bruiser's mother in Legally Blonde 2.
 Honey Tree Evil Eye, a female Bull Terrier, was known as Spuds MacKenzie in her role as the Budweiser spokes-dog
 Nipper, the dog with the gramophone in the HMV logo
 Paddington, a Golden Retriever "professional stand-in, and stunt double", portrays the real Duke Bush (Duffy "Duke" of Castlebury) at promotional events and in commercials for Bush's Best Baked Beans. Duke stars in the commercials, where the dog's owner, Jay Bush (president of the company) pleads for the dog to maintain the secret family recipe. The punchline occurs when the dog states: "Roll that beautiful bean footage."
Tinkerbelle, a Papillon/Maltese mix and canine model featured in advertisements for various companies.

Film
 Ace the Wonder Dog, appeared in numerous films and serials in the 1930s and 1940s
 Beasley, a Dogue de Bordeaux, starred in the film Turner & Hooch
 Ben (II), a Golden Retriever, appeared in many films. His characters included Shadow in Homeward Bound: The Incredible Journey, William in Maybe Baby, Rusty in Purely Belter and Messenger in Made in Hong Kong.
 Bingo, an Otterhound, starring as Sandy in Annie in 1982
 Blair, a Collie, the first dog screen star, starring in Rescued by Rover in 1905
 Buddy, a Golden Retriever, starred in the 1997 film Air Bud but died from cancer a year later. He also played a cameo as Comet on the TV series Full House.
 Butkus Stallone, Sylvester Stallone's personal pet Bullmastiff since a puppy; featured in Rocky as the boxer's "training partner".   Stallone credits Butkus for inspiring the screenplay.
 Cosmo, a Jack Russell Terrier from Beginners. 
 D. J., a Siberian Husky, played the roles of Demon in Snow Dogs and Max in Eight Below
 Darla, a Bichon Frise best known for her role as Precious in the 1991 thriller The Silence of the Lambs.
 Higgins, played the leading role of Benji in the movie of the same name and had a role on the TV series Petticoat Junction.
 Jean, the Vitagraph Dog, screen's first leading canine to have her name in the film title; starred in movies from 1908 to 1913
 Jed (1977-1995), appeared in The Thing, The Journey of Natty Gann and White Fang.
Keystone Teddy, a dog actor in the early 20th century.
 Koko, a red Australian Kelpie, played Red Dog in the 2011 film adaptation based on the eponymous novel.
 Kuma, has been seen in several movies, including the short film Saving Angelo
 Lady, the name of the Basenji dog in the movie Goodbye, My Lady
 Max, a Jack Russell Terrier, played Milo, Jim Carrey's faithful and intelligent dog in the 1994 movie The Mask
 Moonie, a Chihuahua, played the role of Elle Woods' tiny dog Bruiser in Legally Blonde and Legally Blonde 2. Moonie died 10 March 2016 in Los Angeles, California. He is survived by his trainer Sue Chipperton who got him when he was a puppy. He was 18 years old. 
 Moose and his son Enzo, both Jack Russell Terriers, in My Dog Skip and the TV series Frasier.
 Moose (not to be confused with Moose), a German Shepherd owned by Lon Chaney Jr. and the stand-in for the werewolf that bites Larry Talbot in The Wolf Man.
 Mother Teresa, a Newfoundland dog and the major canine character in the movie Must Love Dogs
 Mushroom, starred as the Peltzer family dog in Gremlins
 Pal, a Collie, played Lassie in the movie Lassie Come Home (based on the novel by Eric Knight), six more Lassie films, and two Lassie television show pilots
 Pard, a mutt with a crippled foreleg, stars with Jack Pickford and Marguerite De La Motte in 1919's In Wrong for Vitagraph. Pard does tricks in the film.
 Pete the Pup, portrayed by several American Pit Bull Terriers in the Our Gang (Little Rascals) series
 Red Dog (Pilbara), appeared in Red Dog and Red Dog: True Blue, based on the true life story of a Kelpie who wandered around the outback Western Australia, looking for its owner
 Rin Tin Tin (1918–1932), an internationally famous German Shepherd actor who starred in many silent films and a few sound films. His descendants carried on in film, radio and television roles.
 Skippy, a Wire Fox Terrier who, among other roles in 1930s films, played Asta in The Thin Man film and sequels.
 Strongheart, also known as Etzel von Oeringen, was the first German Shepherd with name-above-the-title billing in a film. He starred in an adaptation of White Fang, released in 1925, and The Return of Boston Blackie, released in 1927.
 Sure Grip's Rattler, an American Bulldog, played the role of Chance in Homeward Bound: The Incredible Journey.
 Sykes, star of several films, adverts and TV series.
 Tango, a Golden Retriever, stars as Bailey in the film Bailey's Billion$.
 Terry, a Cairn Terrier, played Toto in the 1939 movie adaptation The Wizard of Oz.
 Uggie, a Jack Russell Terrier, played Jack in the 2011 film The Artist and Queenie in the film Water for Elephants.
 Zimbo the dog, played Homo the Wolf in the 1928 American silent film The Man Who Laughs directed by the German Expressionist filmmaker Paul Leni
 Zip, a Blue Heeler Australian Cattle Dog famous for his role in the 1995 film Last of the Dogmen. Zip's character is named Zip and has a touching storyline many viewers remember.

Television
 "Beauregard the Wonder Dog", a bloodhound, appeared regularly though unspectacularly on Hee Haw.
 Beejay, a German Shepherd, was the first Rex on Inspector Rex. His formal name is Reginald Von Ravenhorst, which also serves as Rex's full name in the show.
 Bernadette portrayed the Basset Hound "Cleo" in the 1950s TV series The People's Choice
 Blaze, Jr., called JR, a German Shepherd who played Rin Tin Tin in the 1950s TV show The Adventures of Rin Tin Tin.
 Bouncer, played a dog also called Bouncer in the Australian soap opera Neighbours.
 Buck, a Briard, played the role of Buck Bundy on the TV show Married... with Children.
 Bullet, "the Wonder Dog", a black and silver AKC registered German Shepherd (originally: "Bullet Von Berge") was a regular on the '50s TV show The Roy Rogers Show; his taxidermic remains (along with Trigger) were displayed at The Roy Rogers & Dale Evans Museum and he was sold in 2010 at Christie's for $35,000
 Comet, a Golden Retriever, who played Comet on the TV show Full House. He also played Fluke in the film Fluke.
 Graubaer's Boker, plays Bear on Person of Interest
 Happy, furry white dog playing Happy on the TV show 7th Heaven
 Inky, a police dog who appeared in the British police drama Softly, Softly: Taskforce during 1969–70
 Joe, German Shepherd, starring in the television series Run, Joe, Run
 Kyte, a Belgian Tervuren famous for playing Wellard in EastEnders
 Leo, portrayed Jack in Tales of the Gold Monkey
 London portrayed Hobo in The Littlest Hobo series; the character originated in an earlier film
 Madison, a Labrador Retriever, best known for playing the role of Vincent on the television series Lost
 Maui, a Border Collie mix, played Murray on the TV show Mad About You
 Meatball, a female Bull Terrier, in the TV show Baa Baa Black Sheep
 Mick, portrays Stan in the Disney series Dog With a Blog; voiced by Stephen Full
 Molly, a Bichon Frise, played alongside Bruce Gyngell in the Australian mini-series Meweth
 Moose and his son Enzo, played Eddie on the TV show Frasier
 Petra, a mixed breed, the first Blue Peter dog; the 'original' Petra died after making one appearance and was replaced by a look-alike; this was kept secret until many years after the substitute's death
 Pippin, a female mixed breed dog, half Tibetan Terrier, half Bearded Collie in the TV series Come Outside
 Prada, Breezy and Windy, portrayed Captain Archer's dog Porthos on Star Trek: Enterprise
 Prince, a talking dog on the BBC TV show That's Life!
 Pussy Galore, played Truffles, Mildred's terrier, in the British sitcom George & Mildred
 Serena, a small black poodle owned by actress Thelma Scott, appeared as Claire Houghton's pet, Serena, in the final year of the Australian soap opera Number 96 
 Shep, a Border Collie, featured on the Blue Peter television series
 Soccer, a Jack Russell Terrier, star of the PBS show Wishbone
 Sugar-Pie, the dog of model Anna Nicole Smith, starred on the TV series Anna Nicole Show on E!
 Tiger, appeared in The Brady Bunch and played a dog named Blood in the movie A Boy and His Dog
 "Top Gear Dog" (2006-2017), owned by Richard Hammond, occasionally appeared on Top Gear
 Tuskó, a German Shepherd portrayed his father Kántor, the famous Hungarian Detective Dog in the Hungarian TV series Kántor.
 Yukon King, an Alaskan husky who played the lead sled dog and faithful sidekick of Sergeant Preston in Sergeant Preston of the Yukon. 
 Zeltim Odie Peterson, aka Odie the Talking Pug, a pug that said "I Love You" on various talk shows.

Athletes
 Ashley Whippet, the first disc dog, was a canine athlete of the 1970s and three-time winner of the Canine Frisbee Disc World Championships.
 Cindy, a Greyhound who earned Guinness World Record's Highest Jump by a Dog. Cindy cleared a  hurdle.
 Haruitike, a vegan yoga dog in India
 King Buck, a Labrador Retriever, successfully completed an unprecedented 63 consecutive series in the National Championship Stake and was the National Retriever Field Trial Club champion for two successive years (in 1952 and 1953), which accomplishment was not duplicated for nearly 40 years. He was also the first dog to appear on a United States Fish and Wildlife Service duck stamp, which always featured a water fowl.
 Master McGrath, an Irish Greyhound whose racing victories and fame gained him an audience with the British Royal Family.
 Mick the Miller, a racing Greyhound, was the first greyhound to win the English Derby in successive years and the first greyhound to run a  course in under 30 seconds.
 Morghem's .500 Nitro Express, an American Pit Bull Terrier, earned several United Kennel Club titles in his first campaign from the following sports: dock jumping, weight pulling, rally obedience and Show Champion. During the campaign he also passed Canine Good Citizen and USTTA temperament testing, while acquiring 70 points in the American Pulling Alliance with three first place and three second place wins.
 Snip Nua, an Irish racing Greyhound partly owned by comedian Dara Ó Briain. Snip Nua's racing was viewed by 3 million UK viewers on the show Three Men Go to Ireland.

Faithful dogs

Faithful after master's death
 Canelo in Cádiz, Spain, used to walk with his owner to the hospital where he was receiving dialysis treatment. In 1990 his owner died at the hospital. Canelo died outside the hospital after waiting for 12 years. The town of Cádiz put his name to a street and a plaque in his honor.
 Capitán, a German Shepherd, ran away from his home in central Argentina, after the death of his owner Miguel Guzmán in 2006. About a week later, Guzmán's family found Capitán standing guard at Guzmán's grave after finding the cemetery on his own. When brought home, Capitán again ran away back to the grave of his former owner. He stood vigil over his owner's grave and received provisions from the cemetery staff so he did not need to leave. Capitán died in 2018.
 In the mid-1990s in Togliatti, Russia – a family died in a car crash during the summer of 1995, leaving their dog as the only survivor. The German Shepherd, named Constantine aka Kostya or Faithful Kostya by the locals, kept coming to the same spot for the next 7 years braving freezing winters and hot summers. Loyalty – a bronze statue honouring the dog's loyalty was placed on that spot in 2003 by the city authorities.
 Dżok ("Jock"), the dog. Throughout the entire year (1990–1991) Dżok was seen waiting in vain at the Rondo Grunwaldzkie roundabout in Kraków, Poland, to be fetched back by his master, who had died there.
 Fido, a mixed-breed dog, whose master, Carlo Soriani, had died in an air raid over Borgo San Lorenzo (near Florence, in Italy) in 1943, during World War II. Fido waited in vain, for the following 14 years, for Soriani's return, going daily to the bus stop in Luco del Mugello (a frazione of Borgo) where the man used to get off after coming home from work.
 Greyfriars Bobby, a Skye Terrier in Edinburgh, Scotland, was loyal to his master long after his master's death in 1858. Until Bobby's death 14 years later, he reportedly spent every night at his master's grave. A statue in memorial of Greyfriars Bobby was erected near the graveyard. Several films have been made dramatising the life of Greyfriars Bobby, and in folklore he is popularly remembered throughout Scotland as a symbol of loyalty.
 Hachikō, an Akita who became a symbol of loyalty in Japan, is now honored by a statue in Tokyo. Hachikō is famous for his loyalty to his long dead master Hidesaburō Ueno, by returning to the train station and waiting for his return, every day for the next nine years during the time the train was scheduled to arrive.
Hawkeye, a Labrador Retriever, stayed by the coffin of his owner, Jon Tumilson, a Navy SEAL who was killed in Afghanistan on 6 August 2011 when the CH-47 Chinook he was riding on was shot down by a rocket-propelled grenade.
 Heidi, a Jack Russell Terrier, made her way down a 500-foot (150 m) drop in Scotland to get to the body of her owner (after he fell to his death while hiking) and stood guard over his body for 2 days in 2001.
 Heihei (黑黑; Chinese for 'Black Black'), a black dog, gave evidence to police to identify the killer of his old mistress. He was later buried with her.
 Leão, a mixed breed who stayed by the side of his owner who died in January 2011 during Brazil's flood. His owner was Cristina Cesário Maria Santana.
 Ruswarp, a Border Collie who disappeared while hiking with his master Graham Nuttall in the Welsh Mountains near Llandrindod Wells on 20 January 1990. On 7 April, a hiker discovered Nuttall's body near a mountain stream, where Ruswarp had been standing guard for 11 weeks. The 14-year-old dog was so weak he had to be carried off the mountain, and died shortly after Nuttall's funeral. There is a statue of Ruswarp on a platform of Garsdale railway station.
 Seaman, the Newfoundland belonging to explorer Meriweather Lewis, would not eat or leave his owner's grave, and died of grief.
 Shep, belonging to a sheepherder who died in Fort Benton, Montana, in August 1936 followed his master's casket to the train station and fashioned a den under the depot platform after the body was shipped back east. For the next five and a half years, Shep met every passenger train arriving there—four a day—sniffing at the passengers and baggage car doors.  His vigil became widely publicized including a feature in "Ripley's Believe It or Not". Passengers took the Havre to Great Falls rail line just to see the dog, and he received so much fan mail that the Great Northern Railroad assigned a secretary to help with responses. On 12 Jan. 1942, Shep was struck and killed by an arriving train. AP and UPI issued his obituary nationwide; thousands sent condolences and hundreds attended his funeral. The Great Northern erected an obelisk at his gravesite on a bluff overlooking the depot and town. In 1994, the citizens of Fort Benton further memorialized the dog with a heroic bronze erected on the town's steamboat levee.
 Spot, in November 2010, five months after his owner, Wayne Giroux of Lone Oak, Texas, was killed by a drunk driver, a local television station reported that Giroux's Great Dane mix, Spot, was still traveling daily to wait for Giroux at a spot on a country lane where Giroux used to meet him. The story was quickly picked up and disseminated by international media outlets such as CNN.
 Squeak, a Jack Russell Terrier who would not leave the body of his owner, Zimbabwean farmer Terry Ford, after Ford was murdered in 2002 by a violent mob carrying out Zimbabwean president Robert Mugabe's land seizure programs. The photo of little Squeak guarding Ford's bloody body raised worldwide awareness of land-related violence in Zimbabwe.
 Talero is a German shepherd who loyally stayed next to his owner, Bernardo Leónidas Quirós, for 23 days, after Quirós died in a snow storm in Argentina. According to El Patagonico, Talero appears to have prevented wild animals from attacking the body of his owner and survived by hunting small animals. The loyal companion also seems to have slept by his owner's side, attempting to keep him warm and shelter him from the winds. When police approached the body, Talero growled and barked at them, continuing to protect his owner.
 Theo, an English Springer Spaniel belonging to Lance Corporal Liam Tasker of the British Army. Theo was used to sniff out roadside bombs in Afghanistan. In 2010, Theo and Tasker were in a firefight with insurgents, killing Tasker. Theo died later at a British army base from a fatal seizure, although many believe he died from a broken heart. Tasker's body and Theo's ashes were returned to England, where Tasker's family was presented with Theo's ashes in a private ceremony. In October 2012, Theo was posthumously honored with the Dickin Medal, Britain's highest award for bravery by animals.
 Tommy, a 7-year-old German Shepherd, continued to visit the church where his owner's funeral had been held. The owner, Maria Margherita Lochi, used to come with Tommy, to the Santa Maria Assunta church in San Donaci, Italy. After she died, the dog was present at her funeral service and followed after Maria's coffin. The father of the church, Donato Panna, said, "he waits patiently by the side of the altar and just sits there quietly. I didn't have the heart to throw him out—I've just recently lost my own dog, so I leave him there until Mass finishes and then I let him out." Tommy died 20 January 2014 after an illness.
 Waghya, meaning "tiger" in Marathi, was the pet dog of Maratha king Chhatrapati Shivaji. After Shivaji's death, the dog mourned and jumped into his master's funeral pyre and immolated himself. A statue was put up on a pedestal next to Shivaji's tomb at Raigad Fort. 
 Wiley, a wolfdog, was videotaped making sob-like noises at his owner's grandmother's grave.
An unnamed dog drowned himself after his master, aged 77, died after 18 years with him.
Kuvi, an Indian mixed breed female dog, helped police find the remains of her human friend, 2-year-old Dhanushka, after a landslide occurred on 6 August 2020, in Pettimudi, a hamlet located in the state of Kerala, India. Kuvi was later taken in by the Kerala police and given proper care by the local dog squad.
In August 2022, photos of a brown mixed breed dog in one of the underground exits of the La Raza station of CDMX Metro went viral on social media, in which it is said that the dog has been waiting for several weeks day and night for its owner, a woman, presumed dead of an illness.

Homing dogs
 Baekgu, the Korean Jindo Dog, after being sold by the original owner due to economic hardship to a new owner 300 km away, came back to the original owner after 7 months.

Other faithful dogs

 Bob the Railway Dog, a loyal traveller and drivers' companion on the South Australian Railways in the late 19th century.
 Fidèle, a famous dog that could usually be seen sleeping out of his window in Bruges.
 Gelert, a legendary dog associated with the village of Beddgelert, Wales. According to the legend, King Llywelyn returned from hunting angry that his wolfhound, Gelert, had gone missing, only to be greeted joyously by the dog at the front door. The King noticed that Gelert had blood around his mouth but went straight to his infant son's room and found his baby missing, the cradle overturned, and more blood. Imagining that Gelert had killed his baby, Llywelyn drew his sword and killed the dog, whose dying yelp was answered by a baby's cry. Llywelyn lifted the cradle and found his heir under the cradle, along with a dead wolf that had tried to lift and run off with the infant, but had been stopped and killed by Gelert. Overcome with remorse, Llywelyn buried the dog with great ceremony, but never smiled again, plagued by the memory of the Gelert's dying cries. Although experts doubt the legend and the authenticity of Gelert's Grave, Beddgelert people honor and maintain it to this day, and popular Welsh belief in the legend still serves as a warning in that culture against acting rashly in anger when things are not as they seem.
 Kelsey, a dog, was hailed a hero after he rescued his owner who became paralyzed when he slipped and fell in the snow. Kelsey stayed by his side licking his face to keep him warm for nearly 20 hours.
Mari: A Tale of Mari and Three Puppies is based on a true story in the 2004 Chūetsu earthquake. Mari gave birth to three puppies. That spring, animals behaved strangely, foreshadowing something major to come. On 23 October 2004, a major earthquake, which later became known as the Chūetsu earthquake struck and devastated the whole village. At that time, only grandfather and Aya were at home, and they were pinned down by a wardrobe that collapsed onto them. Mari quickly moved her puppies to a safe place and successfully rescued grandfather and Aya from that disaster.
 Old Drum, a hunting dog whose death at the hands of a neighbor was the subject of a lawsuit and George Graham Vest's famous summation to the jury, known as "Eulogy of the Dog", which asserts that a man's unique relationship with his dog should influence how the law is interpreted and implemented in such cases. The case has been influential in courts ever since.
 Pompey, a Pug that foiled an assassination attempt on the life of William The Silent, Prince of Orange.
Red Dog (Pilbara), a Kelpie who wandered around the outback Western Australia looking for its owner.
 Saint Guinefort, a legendary French dog, is venerated with a tradition almost identical to that of Gelert, above.
 Taro and Jiro, two Sakhalin huskies that survived a year of abandonment on the frozen continent of Antarctica until members of a Japanese Expedition team rescued them.
 Zander, a 70-pound (32 kg), approximately 7-year-old Samoyed-husky mix who escaped his home and traveled more than two "hard miles" (fording a stream, crossing a busy highway, and navigating complex neighborhoods) to arrive at a hospital in an area where he had never been, where he was stopped by a hospital employee who called the cell phone number on his dog tag and reached Zander's master in a room inside the hospital where he had been lying for several days recuperating from an illness.

Working dogs

War dogs

 Antis, an Alsatian, served with Václav Robert Bozděch, a Czech airman, in the French Air Force and in the No. 311 (Czechoslovak) Squadron RAF in Britain, and helped his master escape after the death of Jan Masaryk; winner of the Dickin Medal
 Bamse, a Saint Bernard, was a symbol of the Free Norwegian Forces in World War II.
 Bart, a German Shepherd working with SEAL Team Six who was killed along with 38 others which consisted of U.S. special operation troops, aviators and Afghan commandos in 2011.
 Bing, an Alsatian and Collie cross who parachuted with the 6th Airborne Division on D-Day and winner of the Dickin Medal
 Cairo, a Belgian Malinois used by U.S. Navy SEALs in Operation Neptune Spear, in which Osama bin Laden was killed.
 Cappy, a Doberman Pinscher "Devil Dog" credited with saving the lives of at least 250 U.S. Marines during the 1944 Battle of Guam by alerting them to Japanese soldiers. Cappy was mortally wounded on patrol, 23 July, becoming the first Marine K-9 combat casualty. He was the first to be buried in what would become the National War Dog Cemetery in Guam, where his likeness in bronze sits atop the World War II War Dog Memorial that includes names inscribed for the Dobermans who died while serving with the U.S. Marine Corps on Guam.
 Chesty, one of a family of bulldogs, serving as the official mascot of Marine Barracks, Washington, D.C. These dogs are actually enlisted in the U.S. Marine Corps, most attaining the rank of corporal.
 Chips, the most decorated hero war dog of World War II.
 Conan, a Delta Force dog who participated in the Barisha raid in 2019
 Gander, a Newfoundland, was posthumously awarded the Dickin Medal for his feats during the Battle of Hong Kong in World War II.
 Gunner, Canine air-raid early warning system during the bombing of Darwin in World War II.
 Horrie the Wog Dog, found in Egypt by Australian Forces in 1942 during World War II, saved the lives of many Australian soldiers. Horrie was refused admission back to Australia after service in Europe; he was saved by his mates smuggling him to his new home in Australia.
 Jet of Iada an Alsatian, who assisted in the rescue of 150 people trapped under blitzed buildings. He was awarded both the Dickin Medal and the RSPCA's Medallion of Valor for his rescue efforts.
 Judy, a ship's dog who served with the Royal Navy, was the only animal to have been officially registered as a Japanese prisoner of war. She survived the death camps on the Burma Railway and was awarded the Dickin Medal in 1946.
 Just Nuisance, a Great Dane, the only dog to have been officially enlisted in the Royal Navy, was buried with full military honours upon his death in 1944.
 Lava, a mixed breed dog, was adopted as a puppy by the 1st Battalion 3rd Marines Unit nicknamed the Lava Dogs. He was rescued from Iraq in 2005 by Lieutenant Colonel Jay Kopelman. Lava is the subject of the book From Baghdad, With Love by Kopelman and Melinda Roth.
 Lex, the first actively working Military Working Dog to be adopted by family members of their handler, prior to being retired.
 Lucca, a dog working for the U.S. Marine Corps who was awarded the Dickin Medal, the equivalent of the Victoria Cross for dogs.
 Moustache, a poodle said to have participated in several battles of the French Revolutionary and Napoleonic Wars.
 Nemo A534, a German Shepherd who saved the life of his handler in battle despite having been shot in the nose and losing an eye.
 Nigger, a black Labrador Retriever belonging to Guy Gibson, gave his name as the codename for the Dam Busters mission in World War II. His name is usually edited out of modern versions of the film about the mission due to the offensiveness of the term to modern viewers.
 Patron, an explosives detection dog that received the Order for Courage third class during the 2022 Russian invasion of Ukraine
 Philly, a mutt and World War I "hero"; mascot of Company A of the 315 Infantry, 79th Division ("Philadelphia's Own").
 Rags, a Signal Corps mascot during World War I.
 Rex (E168), a U.S. Marine military working dog handled and later owned by Corporal Megan Leavey whose story was chronicled in the film Megan Leavey.
Rifleman Khan, a German Shepherd who won the Dickin Medal for bravery.
 Rip, a World War II search and rescue dog.

 Rob, a Collie working dog on a farm in Shropshire until 1942, when his owners enlisted him as a war dog. Assigned to the Special Air Service at the base in Wivenhoe Park, Essex. Subsequently awarded the Dickin Medal in February 1945.
Sallie Ann Jarrett, Civil War mascot of the 11th Pennsylvania Volunteer Infantry regiment, whose bronze statue is part of the regimental monument at Gettysburg.
 Sarbi, an Australian special forces explosives detection dog who spent almost 14 months missing in action (MIA) in Afghanistan before being recovered in 2009.
 Sasha, bomb-sniffing dog, posthumously awarded the Dickin Medal
 Sinbad, the U.S. Coast Guard's most famous mascot. He was adopted by a crewman from the cutter  prior to World War II. He was so beloved by the crew that they actually enlisted him in the Coast Guard. Sinbad had a book written about him.
 Smoky, hero war dog of World War II, was a Yorkshire Terrier who served with the 5th Air Force in the Pacific after she was adopted by Corporal William Wynne. Smoky was credited with twelve combat missions and awarded eight battle stars. Wynne authored a book about his adventures with Smoky entitled Yorkie Doodle Dandy: Or, the Other Woman Was a Real Dog.
 Stubby, aka Sergeant Stubby, a Boston Terrier/American Pit Bull Terrier, the most decorated war dog of World War I and the only dog to be nominated for rank and then promoted to sergeant through combat. He was also a mascot at Georgetown University.
 Tich, Dickin Medal winner of the King's Royal Rifle Corps during the Second World War.
 Treo, awarded Dickin Medal for work as an Arms and Explosives Search dog in Helmand Province, Afghanistan
 Willy, George S. Patton's bull terrier
 Zanjeer, was a Labrador Retriever who served as a detection dog with the Mumbai Police in Maharashtra state of India. Due to his impeccable service detecting many explosives and other weapons—in particular during the 1993 Mumbai bombings—he was honoured with a full state funeral.

Rescue dogs
 Aspen, a search-and-rescue Golden Retriever who assisted in searching for survivors of the Alfred P. Murrah Federal Building bombing in Oklahoma City in 1995.
 Baillie, an active search and rescue Border Collie on one of Canada's all hazards disaster response teams, Canada Task Force 2 (CAN-TF2), where she specialises in Heavy Urban Search and Rescue (HUSAR). She is also a member of Canmore Fire Rescue and mascot for Banff Emergency Medical Services in the Banff National Park. Baillie has represented Canada at the UNISDR Americas conference and has been honoured with an exhibit on her wearable technology in the Canada Science and Technology Museum in Ottawa. 
 Balto, a famous sled dog, was the lead dog on the final leg of the 1925 serum run to Nome (which relayed diphtheria antitoxin by dog sled across Alaska to combat an epidemic). Balto was memorialized with a statue in New York's Central Park. The Iditarod Race is a commemoration of the 1925 serum run. An animated film was produced in 1995, telling a somewhat dramatized version of the dog's life.
 Barry, a famous Saint Bernard rescue dog, reportedly saved 40 people.
Bilbo, a lifeguard Newfoundland dog on Sennen beach in Cornwall, credited with saving three lives.
 Dakota, was an pit bull search and rescue dog who responded to over 100 searches missions including the search for the astronauts who died in the Space Shuttle Columbia disaster.
 Frida, a Mexican golden Labrador credited with saving 12 people's lives and locating more than 40 bodies during her 9 years of service; gained international fame for rescue and recovery efforts following the 2017 Puebla earthquake in Mexico. 
 Gandalf, a black Shiloh Shepherd search and rescue dog owned by Misha Marshall, found missing Boy Scout Michael Auberry in March 2007.
Kira (2019), an English Golden Retriever became a hero when on her own accord she twice assisted her owner in breaking through ice and rescuing two dogs separately stranded in a frozen lake, rounding up each animal and guiding them safely to shore.
Nico (2015), a recently adopted Bernese mountain dog, became a hero when he saved two people who were being swept out into the ocean by a rip current.
 Peter, a Collie who was a search and rescue dog during World War II.
 Swansea Jack, rescued people from Swansea Bay and the River Tawe.
 Togo, a Siberian Husky, was the lead dog that led the longest track while the team had the antitoxin, during the 1925 serum run to Nome (which relayed diphtheria antitoxin by dog sled across Alaska to combat an epidemic).
 Approximately 350 search and rescue dogs worked at the World Trade Center site following the September 11, 2001 attacks. Rescuers relied on the dogs' sense of smell and agility in tight spaces to seek survivors and recover the remains of victims.
 Ana, the first of the first responder dogs at the World Trade Center
 Apollo, a search and rescue dog who worked at World Trade Center site following the September 11, 2001 attacks.
 Jake
 Trakr, a German Shepherd survivor detection dog who found the last survivor of the World Trade Center attack on 11 September 2001.
Bretagne, a Golden Retriever search and rescue dog, believed to have been the last surviving rescue dog of the World Trade Center attacks when she was euthanized on 6 June 2016, at age 16, following kidney failure.

Guide, service, and facility dogs
 Buddy, a female German Shepherd, the first formally trained guide dog in the United States. She belonged to Morris Frank, who worked to establish The Seeing Eye, the first dog guide school in America.
 Endal, a yellow Labrador Retriever Service dog voted "Dog of the Millennium", famous for extraordinary ability to help his human partner, a disabled veteran, with many aspects of his life, for over a decade, and his role in the promotion of service dog programs.
 Orca, a Golden Retriever assistance dog awarded a PDSA Gold Medal for saving his owner's life.
 Professor Beauregard Tirebiter, University of Southern California's Official Wellness Dog. Beau is USC's first full-time canine faculty member and comes from a "hypoallergenic" mix between a Golden Retriever and a Poodle, also widely known as a "Goldendoodle". Beau is professionally trained as a facility dog and creates well-being throughout his facility, USC.
Roselle, a Golden Retriever guide dog who led her blind owner Michael Hingson to safety from the 78th floor of the North Tower of the World Trade Center after the 9/11 attack.
Salty, a Labrador Retriever guide dog who led his blind owner Omar Rivera from the 71st floor of Tower 1 of the World Trade Center on 9/11.
Sully, former President George H. W. Bush's  yellow Labrador Retriever service dog during his last six months of life.  Noted for his role during the President's state funeral. Subsequently, serving at the Walter Reed National Military Medical Center.
 Trixie Koontz, the Golden Retriever companion of Dean Koontz, was a retired guide dog and the purported author of Life Is Good. Trixie died 30 June 2007 at home, euthanized on her favorite couch with Koontz and his wife holding her in their arms. She had a tumor in her heart.
 Wanda the Yellow Retriever/Lab cross, guide dog to Mhairi Thurston. Wanda was The Guide Dogs for the Blind Association's first 'Overall Guidedog of the Year' in 2004. Wanda retired from service in 2011 and lived a happy retirement with owner Mhairi in Dundee, Scotland until her passing in 2017.

Dogs that aided exploration
 Bud, part of the first automobile trip across the United States in 1903.
 Chinook was the dog team leader for the Byrd Antarctic Expeditions and dubbed an "All American Dog" in the 1920s
 Laika, aka Kudryavka, a Russian stray was the first animal to orbit the Earth, in 1957.
 Leoncico ("Little Lion"), was the dog of the Spanish explorer and conquistador Vasco Núñez de Balboa, exploring and struggling with him across the Isthmus of Panama, from the Atlantic Ocean to the Pacific, in 1513.
 Seaman, Meriwether Lewis's Newfoundland who accompanied the Lewis and Clark Expedition from the Mississippi River to the Pacific coast in modern Oregon, across the northwestern U.S., from 1804 to 1806. He protected them from bears and buffalo, and was a big hit with the Native Americans they came in contact with.

Police dogs
 Agata, a decorated Colombian Labrador detection dog who was so effective in detecting drugs that a bounty of $10,000 was offered.
 Diesel, a Belgian Malinois RAID assault dog deployed by the French police, was killed in a shootout with suspected terrorists in the Saint-Denis area of Paris, while searching for suspects involved in the November 2015 Paris attacks.
 Finn, a German Shepherd of the Hertfordshire Constabulary in England. In 2016, Finn and his handler were both stabbed; the case started a campaign to improve legal protection for public service animals, resulting in a 2019 act of parliament known as "Finn's Law".
 Kántor, a German Shepherd of the Hungarian police, the most successful police dog ever in service from 1954 to 1963. He died after stepping on a landmine on the Austrian border, which was heavily fortified at the time. His body is preserved at the Rendőrmúzeum, the Hungarian national police service's museum in Budapest.
 Rajah, a German Shepherd, was the first police dog to serve in New Zealand.
 Sombra, a German Shepherd detection dog, of the National Police of Colombia is credited for over 200 arrests and the seizure of over 9 tons of illegal drugs. The Clan del Golfo paramilitary group placed a bounty on her life.
 Zanjeer was a Labrador Retriever who served as a detection dog with the Mumbai Police in Maharashtra state of India. Due to his impeccable service detecting many explosives and other weapons—in particular during the 1993 Mumbai bombings—he was honoured with a full state funeral.
 Zuyaqui, a German Shepherd who served the Mexican Federal Police; his body is preserved at the Museo del Enervante drug-trafficking museum.

Other working dogs

Bunkō, a Japanese 'firefighting dog' who lived with and assisted the Otaru Fire Service during the early 20th century.
Don, aka Don the Talking Dog, who vocalized several words
 Gabi, a German Shepherd who worked as a guard dog at the Belgrade Zoo and managed to defeat an escaped jaguar.
 Help, a Scotch Collie who collected for the Orphans Fund of the Amalgamated Society of Railway Servants
 K9 Killer,  a Belgian Malinois dog that works with the Kruger National Park's Special Operations team to prevent rhinoceros poachers in South Africa; awarded a PDSA Gold Medal.
 Lucky and Flo, a pair of black Labrador Retriever detection dogs, notable for being the first animals trained to detect optical discs by scent. They are sponsored by the MPAA and FACT, as part of an initiative to combat copyright infringement relating to motion pictures and DVD discs.
 Oscar,  "Hypnodog", a  black Labrador Retriever, famous for performing as a "canine hypnotist".
After death, his body was stuffed and is on display in the National Postal Museum in Washington, D.C. Featured on a Forever Stamp, and subject of many books.
 Smoky, a Yorkshire Terrier, the first therapy dog
 Station Jim, a popular and successful collector for the Widows' and Orphans' fund of the Great Western Railway.
 Hansel, a 'firefighting dog' and first pit bull arson detection K-9 in the U.S. The dog's handler is New Jersey firefighter Tyler Van Leer of the Van Leers.

Other heroic dogs
Not all dogs that are famous for saving lives are working dogs. Famous lifesaving dogs with no special training or job include the following:

Saved abandoned babies
 Jade, a German Shepherd from Birmingham, England, who saved an abandoned baby. He was walking in a park with his owner when he ran off and laid down, not moving until his master approached, next to an abandoned baby in a bag in the woods. Jade's owner called an ambulance, which took the baby to the hospital, and the baby was saved.
 La China, a free-ranging dog who heard the cries of a newborn infant that had been exposed by her mother in a field near a shanty town outside of Buenos Aires, Argentina. La China found the baby and, without leaving any bite marks on her, brought her back to the relative shelter and warmth of a corner where she was keeping and nursing her litter of puppies. In so doing, La China had brought the baby close enough to people to be heard and saved.
 Mkombozi, a stray dog from the outskirts of Nairobi, Kenya, saved the life of an abandoned baby. On 9 May 2005, Mkombozi while scavenging for food along a road, found an abandoned baby in a package. She dragged it across a road, pulled it through a fence, into a village, to a shed where she was nursing newborn puppies. In doing so, she had brought the baby close enough for its cries to be heard by a woman and her children, who saved the baby. The baby was given the name "Angel" and adopted. The dog was named "Mkombozi", which is Swahili for "savior", and taken in by the local SPCA.

Others
 Buddy, a German Shepherd, was hailed as a hero in 2010 for guiding Alaska State Troopers through winding back roads to a fire at his owners' workshop when their GPS had stopped working.
 Duke, a mixed breed rescue dog in Portland, Connecticut who had been with his family for 6 years, saved the life of 9-week-old Harper Brousseau. On the night of 7 October 2012, Duke jumped into the Brousseau's bed and began shaking uncontrollably. This caused the Brousseaus to wake up and get out of bed. Upon checking on their daughter, they found she had stopped breathing. They then called 911 and the paramedics were able to revive Harper.
 George, a Jack Russell Terrier who shielded a group of children in Manaia, New Zealand, from a pair of attacking pit bulls. He was killed by the pit bulls.
 Gnarley, an American Staffordshire Terrier mix from Sunbright, Tennessee, saved his owner's life when his coworker and roommate attacked him with a machete while working out of state on 26 July 2019. Gnarley made a full recovery from his injuries. An emergency surgery for a fractured skull and long laceration was needed.
 Kabang, a shepherd mix Aspin from Zamboanga City, Philippines who became famous when she saved two children from a potentially fatal motorcycle crash. As a result of the accident, Kabang lost her upper snout.
Lucy, a pit bull who shielded her owner's mother-in-law from an ex-boyfriend with a knife. The man stabbed Lucy multiple times, and she died 19 December 2015, after going into cardiac arrest from blood loss.
Polo, a 6-year-old mixed breed in Baltimore, Maryland, who saved the life of 8-month-old Vivian Poremski. On 15 August 2016, a candle sparked a fast-moving fire in the Poremski home while the mother had stepped out to retrieve an item from her car.  Polo protected Vivian from the flames by laying on top of her, dying in the process.
 Saihu (赛虎 = "like a tiger"), from Jiujiang, Jiangxi Province, southern China. On 28 November 2003, a chef was preparing dinner for almost 30 people at a driving school. The smell of the cooking meat attracted some nearby puppies to the school, along with their mother, Saihu. The chef threw some scraps of meat from the pot to the puppies, but strangely, the puppies' mother prevented them from eating. Saihu also kept barking at the chef, as well as the people who were preparing to eat. Confused but undeterred, the people prepared to eat the meal the chef had made. Saihu became panicked and ran around barking at the guests, before finally eating all the scraps the chef had thrown to the dogs. After just a few minutes, Saihu fell dead on the floor. The guests, shocked at the dog's death, stopped eating the meal. They called a policeman as well as some doctors, who discovered poison in the meat. No people or puppies died. Everyone was convinced that Saihu must have smelled the poison and had saved the people and her puppies by sacrificing herself. The people of Jiujaing were so grateful to Saihu that they set up a tomb in a human graveyard and a statue to memorialize the dog.
Susie, part Pit Bull, rescued after being set on fire in Greensboro, North Carolina; her plight led to passage of Susie's Law.
 Velvet, a black Labrador Retriever and shepherd mixed breed cattle dog, who helped save three climbers when they became stranded on Mount Hood in Oregon on 18 February 2007.
 Wangwang (汪汪 Wāngwāng, meaning "wuff wuff"), a dog member of a Chang (張) family in Taipei who woke the family in a night fire. The family woke their neighbors and saved about 30 lives.
Willie, Labrador retriever, who saved his friend, six-year-old John Stenglein, from a wolf attack at a logging camp nearby on 26 April 2000 in Icy Bay, Alaska. John and an older boy were playing near the edge of a logging camp when a wolf appeared and chased the boys, attacking John when he fell and dragging him towards the woods. Many came running, but only Willie arrived in time to confront the wolf, causing it to drop John before it could make off with him. The others then arrived, the wolf retreated, and John was saved; and then John's father arrived and tracked down and shot the wolf. The wolf was found to have been neither sick nor starving, but habituated to the presence of people. John received 19 laceration and puncture wounds on the back, legs, and buttocks.

Real dogs in literature 
 Angelo, author Leland Dirks' Border Collie, who is the inspiration for the books Angelo's Journey: A Border Collie's Quest for Home and Seven Dogs in Heaven. Part of the proceeds of Angelo's Journey audiobook goes to animal shelters.
 Beautiful Joe, an abused Airedale who was rescued from a brutal master, inspired an 1894 bestselling novel of the same name.
 Charley, a poodle owned by John Steinbeck, was made famous by the book Travels With Charley.
 Endal; a paperback book entitled Endal, published by HarperCollins, was released on 9 February 2009 and went straight to Number 5 in the UK Paperback bestsellers list.
 Jock of the Bushveld, a Staffordshire bull terrier from South Africa in the 1880s, whose owner wrote a book about their travels together.
 Lad, a Rough Collie made famous by three of the novels, including Lad, A Dog, written by owner Albert Payson Terhune
 Marley, a yellow Labrador Retriever, is featured in the memoir Marley and Me.
 Rin Tin Tin, the famous dog actor who had films written for him and who was the subject of the 2007 film Finding Rin Tin Tin
 Seaman, the Newfoundland who travelled across the continent with the Lewis and Clark Expedition, has been the subject of a number of children's books (see Seaman (dog)#Creative literature about Seaman).
 Stickeen, a companion of John Muir in 1880s Alaska. Muir wrote about him in Stickeen: An Adventure with a Dog and a Glacier, one of Muir's best-known writings.
 Tulip, J. R. Ackerley's Alsatian, is the subject of Ackerley's 1956 memoir My Dog Tulip, based on his relationship with his own dog Queenie; adapted as the 2009 animated feature film of the same name.
 Wheely Willy, a paraplegic chihuahua who is the subject of two bestselling children's books.

Mascots

 Bamse, a St. Bernard who was a mascot to the Royal Norwegian Navy minesweeper Thorodd in WWII; became the heroic mascot of the Free Norwegian Forces. 
 Butler Blue, a succession of English Bulldog mascots of Butler University from 2000 on.
 Bullseye, a Bull terrier known for being the mascot of the Target Corporation
 Bully, a Bulldog, is the Mississippi State University mascot.
 Chase "That Golden Thunder", a Golden Retriever, was the mascot of the Trenton Thunder.
 Chesty is the name given to the bulldogs who serve as the official mascot of the United States Marine Corps. They are named after Marine Corps legend Lieutenant General Chesty Puller.
 Dubs II, Dubs II is the University of Washington's 14th live mascot. Born on 4 January 2018, he resides with his family, composed of two human siblings, a feline brother and a canine sister in Sammamish, Washington.
George Tirebiter, former mascot of the University of Southern California
Goldie, a female Golden Retriever, is the official "canine ambassador" of the University of Tulsa.
 Handsome Dan, a bulldog, is the Yale University mascot.
 Hank, unofficial mascot of the Milwaukee Brewers.
 Jack the Bulldog is the mascot of Georgetown University.
 Jiggs II,  Sergeant Major Jiggs II,  Silent White Richard, was the second of a number of English bulldogs to serve as mascots of the United States Marine Corps
 Jonathan, a husky, is the University of Connecticut's mascot, and is named after the state of Connecticut's first governor.
 Nigger, a black Labrador, the mascot of The Dambusters.
 Pio (Newfoundland) ( "Buddy") is the mascot for Lewis & Clark College's Pioneers, in Portland, Oregon. The choice of a Newfoundland is because this was the breed of Seaman, who accompanied the Lewis and Clark Expedition, the first Europeans to cross Oregon. 
 Griff II, an English Bulldog, is the live mascot of Drake University.
 Reveille, the mascot for Texas A&M University
Scotty, a Scottish Terrier, the mascot of Carnegie Mellon University
 Smokey, mascot of the University of Tennessee
 Spike, a bulldog, is the mascot of Gonzaga University.
 Uga, a bulldog, serves as mascot for the University of Georgia.
 Zeke the Wonder Dog, a Labrador retriever, serves as a mascot for Michigan State University

Models
 Boo, a Pomeranian and social media icon with the tagline of "World's Cutest Dog".
 Chalcy, a Weimaraner, is featured in hundreds of photos in books and DVDs in the 101 Dog Tricks series by Kyra Sundance.
 Fay Ray, a Weimaraner, was one of the photography subjects of her owner William Wegman. The name was a play on the name of Wegman's earlier dog Man Ray and the actress Fay Wray.
 Girella, a female Portuguese Water Dog, has been photographed with numerous musicians, as displayed on her website.
 Man Ray, a Weimaraner who belonged to William Wegman, was often photographed by his photographer owner.
 Mr. Winkle, a very small dog of uncertain breed, belongs to Lara Jo Regan, who has published many photos of Mr. Winkle in various costumes and poses.
 Sparky, of The Sparky Project, has been photographed and painted by several artists.

Dogs in science
 Brown Dog, killed after vivisection in February 1903. A memorial statue provoked riots.
 Ch. Fiacre's First and Foremost, low uric acid show dog.
 Marjorie, a depancreatized dog, was the subject of experiments by Frederick Banting and his assistant, Charles Best. Marjorie was kept alive for about 70 days on pancreas extract, which was the first success in the doctors' effort to uncover a means to control diabetes. Ultimately, this led Banting and Best to isolate insulin.
 Pavlov's dogs, who were subjects of Pavlov's research on classical conditioning.
 Snuppy, an Afghan Hound, was the first cloned dog.

Space dogs

The Soviets favored dogs for early space flights, as opposed to the Americans, who preferred monkeys and chimpanzees.

 In 1957 Laika, a female mixed-breed dog, became the first animal to enter orbit when she was launched into space aboard Sputnik 2. Laika's presence led to the mission being dubbed "Muttnik". She was also the first to die in orbit, as no provision was made to return her to the ground.
 In 1960 Belka and Strelka, two Russian mixed breeds, went into space  aboard Sputnik 5 and returned. They were, along with their mice, rats, and rabbit traveling companions, the first animals to survive an orbital flight. Strelka later gave birth to a litter of puppies, one of which, Pushinka, was given to U.S. president John Kennedy's daughter Caroline by Soviet Premier Nikita Khrushchev.

Dogs of unusual size

Small dogs
 Big Boss, a Yorkshire Terrier, was listed as the smallest living dog in the 2002 edition of Guinness World Records.
Boo Boo, a female Chihuahua, is listed in the 2007 Guinness World Records as the smallest living dog in terms of height.
 Danka Kordak Slovakia, a long-haired Chihuahua, holds the Guinness World Record as of 2007 for the shortest (in terms of height) living dog.
 Heaven Sent Brandy, a female Chihuahua, is listed in the 2007 Guinness World Records as the smallest living dog in terms of length.
 Sylvia, a matchbox-size Yorkshire Terrier owned by Arthur Marples of Blackburn, England, was the smallest dog in recorded history.
 Tiny Pinocchio, an abnormally small Yorkshire Terrier, has appeared on several television programs including Oprah and the Today Show.

Heavy dogs
The record was set in November 1989, when Zorba was 8 years old.

Tall dogs
 Giant George, a blue Great Dane that took over Gibson's record as the tallest living dog, measuring 109 cm (43 in) from paw to shoulder; 220 cm (7.2 ft) from head to tail.
 Gibson, a Harlequin Great Dane who was the world's tallest dog until his death in August 2009.
 Titan, a Great Dane who was previously recognised as the world's tallest dog
Zeus, a Great Dane who claimed the tallest dog record on 13 September 2012.

Intelligent dogs
 Betsy, one of the most intelligent dogs, who knows over 340 words
 Chaser, had a vocabulary of 1,022 words, could reason by exclusion, and could recognise objects by the groups they belong to.
 Donnie, a Doberman Pinscher featured on the National Geographic Channel show Dog Genius for his penchant for arranging his toys in geometric forms.
 Jim the Wonder Dog, an intelligent dog honored by a statue in Marshall, Missouri.
 Rico, a Border Collie, can recognize the names of more than 250 toys and fetch them on command.

Long-lived dogs

 Bluey, an Australian Cattle Dog who was officially the world's oldest dog. She died in 1939 at 29 years and 5 months of age.
 Bobi, a Rafeiro do Alentejo, verified to be the oldest dog ever at age 30 years, 243 days.
 Bramble, a Welsh Collie, lived a vegan diet to 25 years old and at the time of her death was the world's oldest dog.
 Chanel, a Dachshund, was thought to be the world's oldest dog as of 31 August 2009 at 21 years old, but another dog, named Max, was later proven to be older.
 Max, a Beagle, Dachshund and terrier mix, who lived 29 years and 282 days.

Show dogs
 Araki Fabulous Willy, a Tibetan Terrier who was Best in Show at Crufts in 2007.
 Baledda Ever Ready, the first Yorkshire Terrier to achieve Supreme Champion status
 Canigou Cambrai, an English Cocker Spaniel who was Best in Show at Crufts in 1996.
 My Own Brucie, an American Cocker Spaniel show dog
 Pulaski's Masterpiece, a toy poodle that disappeared on 29 May 1953
 Tickle Em Jock, the first Scottish Terrier to win Best in Show at the Westminster Kennel Club Dog Show
 Yakee A Dangerous Liaison, a Pekingese who was Best in Show at Crufts in 2003.

Notorious dogs
 Buddha, a Scottish pug trained to give a Nazi salute as a joke by the boyfriend of its owner, Suzanne Kelly. After filming the act and distributing it on YouTube, the boyfriend, Mark Meechan, was found guilty of a hate crime under UK's Communications Act 2003.
 Dempsey, condemned to death under the United Kingdom's Dangerous Dogs Act 1991 but finally reprieved after three years of legal battles
 Dormie, a purebred Airedale Terrier accused of "murdering" 14 cats, resulting in a sensational and landmark 1921 California trial by jury.
 Jackie, a Dalmatian mix whose ability to give a Nazi salute garnered negative attention from Nazi Germany in World War II.
 The alleged runaway dog that started the War of the Stray Dog between Greece and Bulgaria

Ugly dogs

 Elwood, a Chinese Crested–Chihuahua, mixed breed, was a winner of the World's Ugliest Dog Contest in 2007.
 Sam, a blind Chinese Crested hairless, was the three-time winner of the World's Ugliest Dog Contest.

Unique dogs
 Faith, a bipedal dog
 Heart-kun is a Chihuahua in Japan born with a heart-shaped patch of brown hair on its white coated body.

Foundation sires and early dogs
 Abuwtiyuw, one of the earliest dogs whose name is known
 Horand von Grafrath, the first registered German Shepherd, and the foundation sire of the breed.
 Huddersfield Ben, an early Yorkshire Terrier, is universally regarded as the foundation sire of the breed.
 Obo II, foundation sire for all American Cocker Spaniels
 Old Hemp, an early Border Collie
 Old Jock, an early Fox Terrier

Other notable dogs 
 Auditor, a feral dog who lived in the mining area of Butte, Montana.
 Baltic, whose rescue on the Baltic sea received worldwide attention, became the mascot and "crew-member" of Baltica, the Polish research vessel that rescued him.
Bothie, a Jack Russell Terrier who was the first dog to travel to both the South and North Poles.
Brown Dog affair
Bum, a three-footed St. Bernard and Spaniel mix stray who became the 19th-century town dog of San Diego.
 Bummer and Lazarus, a pair of famous stray dogs who lived in San Francisco during the 1860s, often associated with Emperor Norton
Dog on the Tuckerbox
 Dozer, a male Goldendoodle, who raised $25,000 for the University of Maryland Greenebaum Cancer Center by joining the Maryland Half Marathon and crossing the finish line on Sunday, 15 May 2011.
 Eclipse, a female Mastador (half Mastiff, half Labrador) who independently rides a bus from a bus stop near her home to a dog park in downtown Seattle and back. She has become a favorite among commuters.
 Joy, a Spaniel, belonging to the last Russian crown prince Alexei Romanov, with whom he often appears in photographs and from whom he was inseparable. Alexei was executed at the age of 13 with the rest of his family at Ekaterinburg in 1918. Joy was the only survivor of the massacre and was discovered wandering in the grounds of the house shortly after by White Russians who briefly occupied the town too late to rescue the Romanovs. Joy was taken by one of them into exile in Britain where he died at Windsor several years later, still pining for his young master.
 Jonas, a mongrel dog who saved his owner life from a possible drowning in December 2017.
 Kabosu (Japanese: かぼす), a female Shiba Inu most known as the face of Doge.
Kalu, a dog rescued and rehabilitated by the nonprofit animal rescue organization Animal Aid Unlimited after he was found at a construction site in Udaipur, India with almost his entire face destroyed by maggots. The organization makes videos of their rescues, and this went viral due to the horrible injury and his miraculous recovery. After his recovery, he lived the rest of his life happily and healthily at Animal Aid Unlimited. He died of a sudden heart attack in September 2018.
 Kratu, a rescue dog from Romania, whose appearances at Crufts  became a viral phenomenon.
 Lila, British General Howe's fox terrier who wandered off during the  1777 Battle of Germantown; the dog was recovered by American troops and was fed, cleaned and brushed before being returned to the British camp under a flag of truce, with a cordial note from General Washington.
 Loukanikos, a dog who has been present at nearly every recent protest in Athens, Greece, in the last few years.
 Malchik, a mongrel street dog who resided in the Moscow Metro, and whose stabbing death sparked a public outcry.
 Max, an English Springer Spaniel who was the first pet dog to be awarded the PDSA Order of Merit.
 Mishka, a Siberian Husky. Mishka has a YouTube channel with over 500 videos. Mishka became popular from a video of her saying "I love you." Mishka has made several appearances on TV talk shows.
 Natividad, an emaciated stray dog featured in a controversial display by artist Guillermo Vargas Habacuc in the Visual Arts Biennial of Central America, later the subject of widespread rumours on the Internet that he was starved to death by the artist.
 Negro Matapacos, a dog who participated at many street demonstrations in Santiago, Chile.
 Oscar, a Pug belonging to a professor at Virginia Commonwealth University, was the center of public controversy after his owner assigned an advertising class to make the dog famous.
 Paddy the Wanderer, an Airedale Terrier who roamed the streets of Wellington, New Zealand during the Great Depression and was known for taking trips on visiting ships.
  Peter, an Australian "black and fawn colored kelpie sized dog" who was exhumed and taxidermied to be exhibited for a murder trial in Brisbane's Supreme Court; currently at the Queensland Police Museum.
 Pickles, discovered the Jules Rimet trophy (the Football World Cup) after it had been stolen in England in 1966.
 Pickles, a dog often cited as the name origin for the sport of pickleball.
 Presley, the boxer, won the title of the Greatest American Dog in the 2008 CBS television show of the same name.
 Red Dog, a kelpie–cattle dog cross who travelled around the Pilbara region of Western Australia from 1975 (when his truck-driver owner died), befriending many locals, until his death in 1979, believed to have been caused by deliberate strychnine poisoning.
Rigel is renowned as a hero, alerting the Carpathia'''s captain of the weakened survivors before the ship hit them. Rigel was adopted by crewman Jonas Briggs.
 Robot, a dog who belonged to a boy named Simon, discovered the cave paintings at Lascaux in 1940.
 Rosie, an Australian Silky Terrier who saved her owners' lives during a house fire in Launceston, Tasmania in 2010.
 Saucisse, a candidate at the 2001 election of mayor in Marseille and also a candidate in the TV reality show Secret Story 2009 Sensation, the English Pointer featured on the logo of the Westminster Kennel Club Dog Show.
 Star is a mixed-breed female pit bull who was shot by the New York City Police Department in 2012 while she was protecting her homeless owner, who was in the midst of a seizure. Star's shooting was captured on video, and went viral, leading to controversies over police handling of companion dogs.
 Tawny, a yellow Labrador Retriever who in 1999 gave birth to 18 puppies in her very first litter. For this she received the "Iams Mother of the Year" Award.
 Tubby, a cocker spaniel, was the only fatality of the Tacoma Narrows Bridge disaster. Tubby died when the bridge fell and his body was never recovered.
 Tuna, a Chihuahua/Dachshund cross and internet celebrity.
 Willie, a handicapped Dachshund who was killed alongside his owner Barbara Weston in 1993. The discovery of his wheelchair alongside their skeletal remains in a septic pit three years later was pivotal in police identifying them, and bringing their killer Stephen Swaim to justice.
 Willie Bean, a Golden Retriever, was the focus of several political satires during 2008.
 Word, a male Lhasa Apso, was sentenced to death on 4 May 1993 following two biting incidents. He was incarcerated at the Seattle Animal Control Shelter for a total of eight years and 190 days before being released on 10 November 2001, which is the Guinness World Record for the longest time on dog death row.
 Whitney Chewston, a Dachshund originating on Instagram that later became known as the "Homophobic Dog" in internet meme culture.

Fame by proxy to a famous owner
Some dogs are made famous by frequently or prominently appearing in the media with their famous owner.

Actors and entertainers and dogs

 Buster, a Shih Tzu owned by British television presenter Paul O'Grady
 Chalky, a Jack Russell Terrier belonging to English chef and presenter Rick Stein
 Commissioner, a Dachshund whose mistress was actress Carole Lombard. Commissioner ignored Clark Gable completely. After Lombard's death in 1942, the dog would not leave Gable's side.
 Gary, a French Bulldog, companion of the late Carrie Fisher.
 Giggy, a Pomeranian belonging to London-born Beverly Hills business women and reality star on The Real Housewives of Beverly Hills and Vanderpump Rules Lisa Vanderpump
 Google, a Poodle whose master was actor, writer, director and producer Ben Hecht.
 Jazmín (–2006), a Yorkshire Terrier owned by popular Argentine television presenter Susana Giménez. Giménez acquired Jazmín shortly after her December 1988 marriage with Huberto Roviralta and gave him a traditionally female name even though the dog was male. Jazmín lived with Giménez for 17 years and accompanied her on television, in photographic productions and on her international trips, becoming a characteristic feature of the presenter's image and public appearances. Jazmín became the most famous dog in Argentina, and the media coverage he received was unprecedented with any other dog in the country's journalistic history. He was known for his glamorous life, being regularly followed by journalists and paparazzi (whom he confronted on more than one occasion), wearing miniature fur coats and being hairstyled by stylists. Before Jazmín, the Yorkshire was a little-known breed in Argentina, and to this day it is commonly identified in the country as "Susana's dog". During Giménez and Roviralta's 1998 highly publicized divorce, the latter claimed possession of Jazmín, although the judge ruled in favor of Giménez because his pedigree was in her name. Jazmín died on 27 February 2006 after several months in which he suffered from cough, kidney and heart failure, water in the lungs and constant agitation. The news of his death appeared on the front page of several newspapers and was discussed as a central topic across Argentine television. 
 Meatball, an English Bulldog owned by Adam Sandler, starred in the short A Day with the Meatball.
 Olga owned by British television presenter Paul O'Grady
 Spike, a Yorkshire Terrier was the former canine sidekick of television celebrity Joan Rivers. The corporate logo of Rivers' PGHM (Please God Help Me) Productions featured an image of her beloved Spike in a prayerful pose with a halo over his head.
 Sui, a Staffordshire Bull Terrier owned by Steve Irwin who was featured in The Crocodile Hunter series on Animal Planet
 Tinkerbell, dog of Paris Hilton
 Vida, Model Gisele Bündchen's Yorkshire Terrier, has often been photographed with her famous owner.
 Zero was Humphrey Bogart's dog and appeared with him in High Sierra (1941).
 Schnorbitz, St Bernard owned by Bernie Winters, an English comedian and the comic foil of the double act Mike and Bernie Winters with his older brother, Mike. Winters later performed solo, often with the aid of his dog. Following his death, Winters bequeathed Schnorbitz to showman Richard De Vere.

Artists

 Lump, dachshund of a friend of Pablo Picasso, featuring in and inspiring several of his paintings.
 Andy Warhol and Dachshund "Archie" or "Amos"
 William Hogarth made several paintings with his pug, including Painter and his Pug.

Musicians
 Koji and Gustav, two of Lady Gaga's French bulldogs, were stolen from their dogwalker, Ryan Fischer, while out for a walk in Los Angeles, California. Fischer was attacked and shot in the chest, severely wounding him. The dogs were found and returned to Gaga by Jennifer McBride, who was falsely accused of the crime, for a $500,000 reward. The true attackers were later found and arrested. 
 Lolabelle, Laurie Anderson's Rat Terrier, is the major focus of her film Heart of a Dog.
 Lou dog, a Dalmatian, Bradley Nowell's (Sublime's vocalist and guitarist) dog, often featured on the band's CD art.
 Martha, Paul McCartney's Old English Sheepdog, which inspired the Beatles' song "Martha My Dear".
 Mate, Miley Cyrus's German Shepherd, was named after her favorite Australian word, mate.
 Max, David Bowie's dog, has heterochromia, a condition frequently attributed to Bowie (who in reality had anisocoria). 
 Mercy, Fiona Apple's dog, who contributed "vocals" to her 2020 album Fetch The Bolt Cutters, and features regularly in social media posts.
 Mina, Sir Edward Elgar's Cairn Terrier, after whom he named his final orchestral work.
 Mocha, Kelly Rowland's Yorkshire Terrier, was featured on an episode of Cribs on MTV.
 Sage, Jim Morrison's Shepherd mix, the dog owned by Jim Morrison from music group The Doors and his partner Pamela Courson.
 Seamus, the dog of singer Steve Marriott, can be heard on the Small Faces track "The Universal" and more prominently on the Pink Floyd track "Seamus".
 Strider, Robert Plant's dog, is the "blue-eyed merle" mentioned in the Led Zeppelin track "Bron-Y-Aur Stomp".
 Veela, Shirley Manson's dog, a terrier adopted from the streets of Los Angeles.
 Ziggy, Molly Meldrum's dog, played himself in the miniseries Molly. It is the fourth dog who Meldrum has named after the David Bowie character Ziggy Stardust.

Political figures
 Blondi, Adolf Hitler's German Shepherd Dog.
 Boye, Prince Rupert of the Rhine's poodle, who went into battle with him.
 Caesar, Fox Terrier owned by King Edward VII.
 Dash, King Charles Spaniel owned by Queen Victoria.
 Dilyn, the Jack Russell cross of Boris Johnson
 Dookie, the first of many Pembroke Welsh Corgis owned by the British royal family.
 Konni, Russian President Vladimir Putin's Labrador Retriever.
 Lennu, the Boston Terrier dog of President of Finland Sauli Niinistö.
 Looty, the Pekingese dog looted from the Summer Palace and gifted to Queen Victoria. 
 Pat, Irish Terrier owned by former Canadian Prime Minister William Lyon Mackenzie King. After Pat died, King had séances to "communicate" with Pat.
 Resistência Lula da Silva, pet mongrel owned by Brazilian President Luiz Inácio Lula da Silva.
 Seamus, Mitt Romney's Irish Setter, which was the subject of controversy during the 2008 US presidential election and the 2012 U.S. presidential election.
Susan, Pembroke Corgi owned by Queen Elizabeth II. All of Queen Elizabeth's corgis descended from Susan.
Tongdaeng, a stray dog that was owned by King Rama IX of Thailand, he wrote a book about her in 2002.

U.S. Presidents and their families

 Barney and Miss Beazley, President George W. Bush's Scottish Terriers.
 Bo and Sunny, President Barack Obama's Portuguese Water Dogs.
 Buddy, President Bill Clinton's chocolate Labrador Retriever.
Champ and Major, Joe and Jill Biden's German Shepherds. Major is the first shelter dog to ever live in the White House.
 Checkers, President Richard Nixon's Cocker Spaniel, was made famous in the Checkers speech.
 Dash, First Lady Caroline Harrison's collie mix.
 Fala, President Franklin Delano Roosevelt's Scottish Terrier, was a gift from Roosevelt's cousin, Margaret Suckley. Fala is depicted in the Franklin Delano Roosevelt Memorial.
 Fido, family pet of President Abraham Lincoln
 Him and Her, President Lyndon Johnson's Beagles, were famous for the public uproar Johnson caused by lifting them by their ears.
 Laddie Boy, a famous Airedale terrier owned by Warren G. Harding.
 Liberty, President Gerald R. Ford's Golden Retriever, gave birth to eight puppies in the White House in 1975.
 Manchu, Alice Roosevelt's small black Pekingese, was a gift from the last Empress of China.
 Millie, First Lady Barbara Bush's English Springer Spaniel, credited as author of the #1 New York Times non-fiction bestseller Millie's Book.
 Pete, President Theodore Roosevelt's Bull Terrier, bit so many people he was exiled from the White House.
 Pushinka, President Kennedy's mix (space dog Strelka's puppy)
 Rex, Ronald Reagan's dog while in office.
 Spot "Spotty" Fetcher, President George W. Bush's English Springer Spaniel, was named after Scott Fletcher, a former Texas Rangers baseball player.

Writers and poets
 Boatswain, the favorite pet of Lord Byron, was the subject of the poet's Epitaph to a dog.
 Cabal, the white German Shepherd belonging to Neil Gaiman, who frequently features in his blog.
 Flush, Elizabeth Barrett Browning's Cocker Spaniel who was the subject of Virginia Woolf's Flush: A Biography, published in 1933.
 Jacksie, a small dog belonging to C. S. Lewis in his childhood, died in an accident when Lewis was four years old. Shortly thereafter, a young Lewis began calling himself Jacksie. Lewis was known to friends and family as Jack for the rest of his life.
 Josephine, a black miniature Poodle belonging to author Jacqueline Susann, and subject of her memoir Every Night, Josephine!.
 Marley, a yellow Labrador Retriever, was owned by journalist John Grogan. Marley was a neurotic dog, but proved himself to be a great and memorable pet, as stated in Grogan's book Marley & Me.
 Marlowe, Stephen King's Pembroke Welsh Corgi, inspired the character of Oy in King's fantasy series The Dark Tower.
 Nero, who belonged to Thomas and Jane Carlyle. He was small, 'part Maltese terrier, part mongrel', black and white, and described by Jane as having 'long white silky hair hanging all about him – and over his eyes which are very large and black'. Arriving in 1849, he stayed with them until his death in 1860.
 Phiz, a Boston Terrier, was given to Helen Keller by some of her classmates from Radcliffe College.
 Pippin, whose carsickness inspired K. V. Johansen's series of picture books.
 Trixie Koontz a retired service dog who died 30 June 2007, purported author of Life is Good: Lessons in Joyful Living and Christmas is Good'', companion of Dean Koontz

Other
 Bambi, was a Chihuahua owned by prominent Northern Irish loyalist Sammy Duddy. Bambi received much media attention when he was shot dead in 2002 by rival loyalists during a gun attack on Duddy's home in Belfast.
 Blue, Don Cherry's dog
 Daddy, owned by rapper Redman, who is famously part of Cesar Millan's pack when his master is travelling.
 Diamond, Sir Isaac Newton's favorite dog
 Jo-Fi, a Chow Chow belonging to Sigmund Freud. Jo-Fi often sat in on therapy sessions and assisted in calming patients
 Nash, three-year-old male Alaskan husky, was part of Jeff King's Iditarod team, which also saw injuries to Crosby, a three-year-old male, and Banjo, a two-year-old male.
 Peritas, Alexander the Great's favourite dog.
 Roscoe, vegan bulldog owned by Lewis Hamilton, who makes frequent appearances at Formula One grands prix.
 Scipio, St. Bernard of Orville Wright
 The 75 Dachshunds of William Randolph Hearst, who lived at his ranch, Hearst Castle.

Miscellaneous
 Bane and Hera, two Presa Canarios owned by Marjorie Knoller and Robert Noel who killed Diane Whipple.

See also
 Dickin Medal
 Dogs in the American Revolutionary War (not war dogs)
 List of individual cats
 List of dog breeds
 List of dog types
 List of oldest dogs
 List of fictional dogs
 List of wolves
 List of Labrador Retrievers 
 List of wealthiest animals
 PDSA Gold Medal, animal award for bravery and devotion to duty
 Dogs portal

References

External links
 

 
Individual
Dog